The Lloyd Noble Center is a 10,967-seat multi-purpose arena located in Norman, Oklahoma, some  south of downtown Oklahoma City. It opened in 1975 and is home to the University of Oklahoma men's and women's basketball teams.

History
Before the construction of the facility, the teams played in the much smaller OU Field House, located on campus near Oklahoma Memorial Stadium. With the success of Sooner basketball in the 1970s and star forward Alvan Adams, demand became sufficient to upgrade to the modern and spacious Lloyd Noble Center, named after an alumnus and former member of the OU Board of Regents who gave OU's first ever $1 million gift to finance the center. The Sooners frequently sold out the arena during the Billy Tubbs era, with All-American forward Wayman Tisdale leading the high-scoring team to several Big Eight Conference titles and NCAA Tournament appearances. This led to the popular colloquialism around Norman that Lloyd Noble Center is "the house that Alvan built and Wayman filled."

In January 2006, the NBA and the New Orleans Hornets decided to move two games from the Pete Maravich Assembly Center in Baton Rouge to Oklahoma City due to the devastation of Hurricane Katrina and the subsequent low attendance it caused. The Ford Center in Oklahoma City was unavailable for one of the games against the Sacramento Kings, so it was moved to the Lloyd Noble Center.

The center was named after Samuel Lloyd Noble (1896–1950), a Houston oilman and philanthropist, and founder of the Noble Corporation and the Samuel Roberts Noble Foundation.

Concerts
As a concert venue, the Lloyd Noble Center can hold between 2,848 and 4,516 in a theater set-up, 6,165 for end-stage concerts, and 11,238 for center-stage concerts. There are 12 concession stands at the concourse.

Elvis Presley performed two back-to-back concerts at the center on March 25 & 26 1977. He died five months after the concerts on August 16, 1977.

Amy Grant recorded half of her live albums, In Concert and In Concert Volume Two, here.

Journey performed 3 concerts here for their Frontiers tour on July 19, 20, 21, 1983, also 1 concert on 12/1/98.

See also
List of NCAA Division I basketball arenas

References

External links
Lloyd Noble Center Official site
Lloyd Noble Center at Soonersports.com

College basketball venues in the United States
College gymnastics venues in the United States
Convention centers in Oklahoma
Oklahoma Sooners basketball venues
Sports in Oklahoma City
Indoor arenas in Oklahoma
New Orleans Hornets venues
University of Oklahoma campus
1975 establishments in Oklahoma
Sports venues completed in 1975